Naas Racecourse is a horse racing venue in Naas, County Kildare, Ireland, approximately 18 miles from Dublin. The course stages both Flat racing and National Hunt racing and in 2010 fifteen race meetings were held there.

The Naas Races Company was formed in 1922 and the first meeting at the course was held on 19 June 1924. The course is left-handed with an uphill finish and a long run-in.

Naas stages several Grade Two National Hunt races, including the Slaney Novice Hurdle, Nas Na Riogh Novice Chase and the Johnstown Novice Hurdle, and one Group Three flat race, the Blue Wind Stakes. Another flat race, the Fillies' Sprint Stakes, held Group Three status from 2006 to 2010.

Amongst horses that have taken part in races at Naas are Ragusa, the 1963 Irish Derby and Eclipse Stakes winner, and Arkle, winner of the Cheltenham Gold Cup in 1964, 1965 and 1966.

Notable races

References

External links
Official website

 
1924 establishments in Ireland
Horse racing venues in the Republic of Ireland
Sports venues in County Kildare
Sports venues completed in 1924